Cameron Ross McIntosh (July 7, 1871 – August 8, 1971) was a Canadian politician and newspaper publisher. He was born in Dornoch, Ontario, in 1871. McIntosh served as a high school principal before his career in the public arena.

Publishing career
In 1912, McIntosh acquired the North Battleford News, a Saskatchewan newspaper that had been established several years previously. Also in 1912, McIntosh founded the McIntosh Publishing Company and continued as president and publisher until his death in 1971. Upon his death, his son Irwin became president and publisher.

Political career
In 1925, Cameron McIntosh won election to the Parliament of Canada and served in the House of Commons of Canada as a Liberal MP until he was defeated in 1940 by Dorise Nielsen. During his fifteen-year tenure in government, McIntosh served as chairman of the Industry and International Relations Standing Committee and towards the end of his parliamentary career was adviser to Canada's delegates to the International Labor Conference in Geneva.

Later years
In 1959, at age 88, McIntosh received a CWNA (Canadian Weekly Newspapers Association) Honorary Life Membership. Cameron Ross McIntosh died thirty-two days after his 100th birthday in 1971. He is one of only six members of the Canadian Parliament to reach centenarian status, the others being David Wark (1805–1906), Georges-Casimir Dessaulles (1827–1930), Sir William Mulock (1844–1944), Norman McLeod Paterson (1883–1983) and Charles Willoughby (1894–1995).

Links and references
 

1871 births
1971 deaths
Canadian centenarians
Men centenarians
Members of the House of Commons of Canada from Saskatchewan